The 2002–03 Scottish League Cup was the 57th staging of the Scotland's second most prestigious football knockout competition, also known for sponsorship reasons as the CIS Insurance Cup.

The competition was won by Rangers, who defeated Celtic 2–1 in the Final.

First round

Second round

Third round

Quarter-finals

Semi-finals

Final

External links 
Scottish League Cup 2002/2003

Scottish League Cup seasons
League Cup